For a list of other people named Robert Kelley see Robert Kelley (disambiguation)

Robert F. Kelley (1894 February 13, Somerville, Massachusetts – 1976) was an adamantly anticommunist official of the US State Department who influenced a generation of Russian specialists such as George F. Kennan and Charles Bohlen. He received a BA from Harvard in 1915 and a MA in 1917 and continued with postgraduate work at the University of Paris (Sorbonne). Kelley served in the US Army during World War I. In 1922 he joined the State Department and, in 1926, became the head of the newly created Division of Eastern European Affairs. Kelley left the State Department in 1945 to join a private organization that eventually sponsored Radio Liberty, an anti-Soviet broadcasting service.

References

Further reading
 DeSantis, Hugh. Diplomacy of Silence. The American Foreign Service, the Soviet Union, and the Cold War, 1933-1947 (1980), pp 11-26.
Schulzinger,  Robert D. The Making of the Diplomatic Mind: The Training, Outlook, and  Style of United States Foreign Service Officers, 1908-1931 (Wesleyan Univ. Press, 1975).
 Weil,  Martin. A Pretty Good Club: The Founding Fathers of the  United States Foreign Service (W.W> Norton, 1978), pp 46-63.

1894 births
1976 deaths
Harvard University alumni
University of Paris alumni
People from Somerville, Massachusetts
United States Department of State officials